Cyrtodactylus slowinskii, known commonly as Slowinski's gecko, is a species of lizard in the family Gekkonidae. The species is endemic to Myanmar.

Etymology
The specific name, slowinskii, is in honor of American herpetologist Joseph Bruno Slowinski.

Habitat
The preferred natural habitat of C. slowinskii is forest.

Reproduction
C. slowinskii is oviparous.

References

Further reading
Bauer AM (2002). "Two New Species of Cyrtodactylus (Squamata: Gekkonidae) from Myanmar ". Proceedings of the California Academy of Sciences 53 (7): 73–86. (Cyrtodactylus slowinskii, new species, pp. 79–85, Figures 4–5).
Bauer AM (2003). "Descriptions of Seven New Cyrtodactylus (Squamata: Gekkonidae) with a Key to the Species of Myanmar (Burma)". Proc. California Acad. Sci. 54 (25): 463–498.
Rösler H, Glaw F (2008). "A new species of Cyrtodactylus Gray, 1827 (Squamata: Gekkonidae) from Malaysia including a literature survey of mensural and meristic data in the genus". Zootaxa 1729: 8–22.

Cyrtodactylus
Reptiles described in 2002